Olorinab (APD371) is a drug being developed by Arena Pharmaceuticals for the treatment of gastrointestinal pain associated with Crohn's disease and irritable bowel syndrome. It acts as a potent and selective cannabinoid CB2 receptor agonist and is claimed to be orally active and peripherally selective. Initial Phase IIa exploratory clinical trials have been successful in patients with quiescent Crohn's disease. Arena initiated the Phase IIb Captivate trial in late July 2019 in patients with irritable bowel syndrome related pain, in constipation and diarrhea predominant sub-types. The Phase IIb trial is expected to enroll 240 participants between the ages of 18 to 70.Three doses of 10 mg, 25 mg, and 50 mg are being tested against Placebo in a 3:4 prescription ratio with a Quadruple (Participant, Care Provider, Investigator, Outcomes Assessor) masking layout.

In 2019, a study showed that Olorinab reduces Visceral Hypersensitivity in the TNBS-induced colitis animal model, attempting to control for its mechanism of action by using a CB2 antagonist (SR-144,528). Results were favorable showing reduced visceral hypersensitivity in animal models of IBD and IBS but not in healthy controls, suggesting that activation of CB2 causes antinociceptive actions in visceral sensory pathways in models of IBD and IBS. Also, SR-144528 prevented olorinab-induced inhibition of colonic nociceptor hypersensitivity, further validating the role of the CB2 receptor in nociception.

See also 
 MDMB-FUBINACA (similar structure but agonist at both CB1 and CB2 receptors)
 NESS-040C5
 Tedalinab

References 

Cannabinoids
Pyrazoles
Pyrazines
Tert-butyl compounds
Carboxamides
Peripherally selective drugs
Experimental drugs